Harald Huffmann (3 June 1908 – 20 December 1992) was a German field hockey player who competed in the 1936 Summer Olympics.

He was the captain of the German field hockey team, which won the silver medal. He played three matches as forward.

External links
 
Profile

1908 births
1992 deaths
Field hockey players at the 1936 Summer Olympics
German male field hockey players
Olympic field hockey players of Germany
Olympic silver medalists for Germany
Olympic medalists in field hockey
Medalists at the 1936 Summer Olympics